Obrażejowice  is a village in the administrative district of Gmina Radziemice, within Proszowice County, Lesser Poland Voivodeship, in southern Poland.

References

Villages in Proszowice County